Lou Nanli (born 1981 in Shanghai, China), better known as B6, is a Chinese DJ, music producer, multimedia artist and graphic designer. He began producing electronic music and sound art in 1999 as B6, and graduated from the China Academy of Art in 2004. He is often cited as being one a pioneer of the Chinese electronic music scene.

Biography 
In 2000, he founded the independent record label, Isolation Music. He also released a series of his own compositions while producing the sound and album artwork for a number of alternative underground musicians. His own music covers a variety of genres ranging from techno and house, to IDM, Ambient, Electro, Experimental and Industrial Noise. He is also the co-founder of the arts and culture website Neocha.com, and Antidote Shanghai.

In 2006, he released B6 Box, a six-CD compilation of his early work. In 2008, his solo album Post Haze dropped in China and was reissued for the European market by Swedish record label Substream in 2009 to critical acclaim. Over the years, Lou Nanli has teamed up with other musicians to produce collaborative work as AITAR, Dust Box, Igo and ISMU. Touring extensively across the world, Lou Nanli has performed at several legendary music venues and festivals, alongside artists like Richie Hawtin, Juan Atkins and Sven Vath.

In 2008, he was featured on a special episode titled "The Culture Show Goes To China" of The Culture Show, a TV program on BBC television in the UK.

As a multimedia artist, his work has been displayed at galleries and venues in Europe, North America and the UK. One of the most popular of these is an audiovisual installation titled "Sound of the City" that was showcased at the V Arts Centre in Shanghai in 2011 as part of the group exhibition, Alternative Narrative: Chinese Video Art in the New Decade.

Discography

Singles 

 "Take You With A Sigh" - 2009
 "Blind Leading The Blissed" - 2009
 "Fiction City Remixes" - 2010
 "Red Sky" feat. KAKA - 2010
 "Sweet Light" - 2010
 "A Thinner Shade Of Green" - 2011
 "City Maze" - 2011

EPs 

 Little 9 EP - 2005
 My Post-Rock Yard EP - 2005
 4 Years Of Acupuncture with DJ Sodeyama, ELVIS.T, and Mia - 2011
 Bomb In The Shelter - 2012

Albums 

 Post Haze - 2008

Compilations 

 B6 Box - 2005

Associated Acts and Collaborations 

 AITAR - Composed of B6 and Mhp (Ma Hai-Ping), AITAR is an industrial noise duo that released its self-titled album in 2001 and AITAR II, its second album, in 2004.
 Dust Box - Together with Cy, B6 released the album Tuesday in 2004 under the collaborative moniker Dust Box.
 Igo - In 2007, B6 and J Jay released the album Synth Love as Igo.
 ISMU - ISMU, or Intelligent Shanghai Mono University, is an electronic music collective featuring B6, Cy, Susuxx, and Zoojoo. The album 7.9 was released in 2003.
 Junkyard - B6 was also a former member of the group Junkyard.

References

External links
 B6 at MySpace.
 B6 discography at Discogs.
 Neocha.com arts website.

Chinese DJs
Chinese electronic musicians
Living people
Musicians from Shanghai
Electronic dance music DJs
1981 births